Qulensya Wa Abd Al Kuri District is one of two districts of the Socotra Governorate, Yemen. It occupies the western part of the main island of Socotra archipelago, and all other islands of the archipelago. It is named after its capital, Qulensya, on the north coast of Socotra island, and Abd al Kuri, the second largest island of the archipelago. As of 2003, the district had a population of 10,109 inhabitants.

References

Districts of Socotra Governorate